Yacouba "Yac" Diori Hamani Magagi (born 8 September 1997) is a Nigerien professional footballer who plays for Spanish club CD Castellón and the Niger national team. Mainly a central defender, he can also play as a right back.

Club career
Born in Niamey, Magagi started his career abroad in 2016, with Spanish side Club Internacional de la Amistad in the regional leagues. On 12 September of that year he moved to SD Ponferradina, initially assigned to the reserves. 

Magagi made his first-team debut on 14 May 2017, starting in a 0–0 home draw against CD Tudelano in the Segunda División B. He was promoted to the first team for the 2017–18 season, but only appeared rarely in the club's promotion campaign.

Magagi made his professional debut on 19 October 2019, starting in a 1–1 home draw against CD Numancia. The following 20 January, he moved to Getafe CF's reserves on loan for the remainder of the season.

Upon returning, Magagi featured rarely before joining Primera División RFEF side CD Castellón on 22 July 2021. On 25 September, he scored his first goal for the side, netting a last-minute equalizer in a 1–1 draw against UE Cornellà.

International career
Magagi made his full international debut with the Niger national team on 4 June 2016, starting in a 2017 Africa Cup of Nations qualifiers 0–1 loss against Namibia.

References

External links
 
 
 

1997 births
Living people
People from Niamey
Nigerien footballers
Association football defenders
Segunda División players
Primera Federación players
Segunda División B players
Divisiones Regionales de Fútbol players
SD Ponferradina B players
SD Ponferradina players
Getafe CF B players
CD Castellón footballers
Niger international footballers
Nigerien expatriate footballers
Expatriate footballers in Spain